Dó paper (Vietnamese: giấy dó, chữ Nôm: 𫷏𦾤 "mulberry paper") is a paper made from the inner bark of the dó tree and traditionally produced in many villages in Vietnam. It plays an important role in folk art, Dong Ho Painting in particular, because of its durability.

Production process 
The production process includes some stages. First, the bark is soaked in limewater for three months. Second, the black outer bark is husked off and ground by mortar and pestle before being blended with a viscous substance made from a plant belonging to the family Verbenaceae. This mixture is diluted to form a slurry. A bamboo mold (Vietnamese: liềm xeo) is dipped into the vat of slurry and removed. Paper fibers adhere to the mold in a thin sheet that is then pressed, dried, rolled, and dried again. The final product must be soft, light, and durable.

Applications
Due to its durability, this paper found many uses in traditional Vietnam, including the making of books, paintings, and documents.

Paper
Vietnamese painting